Statistics of Emperor's Cup in the 1993 season.

Overview
It was contested by 32 teams, and Yokohama Flügels won the championship.

Results

1st round
Kashima Antlers 1–1 (PK 3–2) NKK
Tohoku Electric Power 3–2 Sanyo Sumoto S.C.
Nagoya Grampus Eight 2–1 Yamaha Motors
Kochi University 0–5 Gamba Osaka
JEF United Ichihara 3–0 Osaka University of Commerce
Toshiba 2–1 Fukuoka University
Seino Transportation SC 1–2 Chuo University
Sapporo University 0–6 Shimizu S-Pulse
Yokohama Marinos 3–1 Hitachi
Doshisha University 2–4 Kawasaki Steel
Waseda University 3–0 Hokuriku Electric Power
National Institute of Fitness and Sports in Kanoya 1–2 Sanfrecce Hiroshima
Yokohama Flügels 4–1 Tanabe Pharmaceuticals
Otsuka Pharmaceutical 0–3 Urawa Red Diamonds
Cosmo Oil Yokkaichi 1–0 Fujita Industries
Hokkaido Electric Power 0–5 Verdy Kawasaki

2nd round
Kashima Antlers 6–1 Tohoku Electric Power
Nagoya Grampus Eight 3–2 Gamba Osaka
JEF United Ichihara 2–0 Toshiba
Chuo University 0–1 Shimizu S-Pulse
Yokohama Marinos 2–1 Kawasaki Steel
Waseda University 0–2 Sanfrecce Hiroshima
Yokohama Flügels 4–3 Urawa Red Diamonds
Cosmo Oil Yokkaichi 0–2 Verdy Kawasaki

Quarterfinals
Kashima Antlers 5–3 Nagoya Grampus Eight
JEF United Ichihara 1–2 Shimizu S-Pulse
Yokohama Marinos 1–3 Sanfrecce Hiroshima
Yokohama Flügels 2–1 Verdy Kawasaki

Semifinals
Kashima Antlers 1–0 Shimizu S-Pulse
Sanfrecce Hiroshima 1–2 Yokohama Flügels

Final

Kashima Antlers 2–6 Yokohama Flügels
Yokohama Flügels won the championship.

References
 NHK

Emperor's Cup
Emperor's Cup
1994 in Japanese football